Aileen Manning (January 20, 1886 – March 25, 1946) was an American film actress.

Manning was in demand as a character actress in silent films. She was known for her roles in silent and early talkie films, including Uncle Tom's Cabin (1927) and Huckleberry Finn (1931).

About her performance in Everybody's Sweetheart (1920), Variety wrote that she "makes the character necessarily disagreeable, but true to life". She played Queen Anne in A Lady of Quality (1924); it was noted that she bore a resemblance to the character she was playing. She played another queen, Elizabeth I, in the MGM short The Virgin Queen (1928).

Manning lived at Hollywood-by-the-Sea. She died on March 25, 1946 in Hollywood.

Filmography 

 A Regular Fellow (1919) as Mrs. Horatio Grimm
 The Little Shepherd of Kingdom Come (1920) as Cousin Lucy
 Heart of Twenty (1920) as Aunt Lucy
 Everybody's Sweetheart (1920) as Mrs. Willing
 Her Husband's Friend (1920) as Dr. Henrietta Carter
 Home Stuff (1921) as Mrs. 'Pat'
 Beauty's Worth (1922) as Aunt Cynthia Whitney
 A Tailor-Made Man (1922) as Miss Shayn
 Rags to Riches (1922) as Purist League member
 The Power of Love (1922) as Ysabel Almeda
 Mixed Faces (1922) as Mrs. Molly Crutcher
 Nobody's Money (1923) as Prue Kimball
 Main Street (1923) as Mrs. Stowbody
 Lovers' Lane (1924) as Miss Mealy
 The House of Youth (1924) as Aunt Maggie Endicott
 The Snob (1924) as Lottie
 The Bridge of Sighs (1925) as Mrs. Smithers
 Enticement (1925) as The Old Maid
 Under the Rouge (1925) as Mrs. Fleck
 Thank You (1925) as Hannah
 Stella Maris (1925) as Mary Heaton
 The Boy Friend (1926) (uncredited)
 The Whole Town's Talking (1926) as Mrs. Van Loon
 Uncle Tom's Cabin (1927) as Aunt Ophelia (as Aileen Mannin)
 Man, Woman and Sin (1927)
 The Virgin Queen (1928) (Short) as Queen Elizabeth
 The Olympic Hero (1928) as Physical Instructress
 Heart to Heart (1928) as Aunt Meta
 Home, James (1928) as Mrs. Elliot
 Vacation Waves (1928) (Short) as Eddie's Mother-in-law
 A Single Man (1929)  as Mrs. Farley
 Sweetie (1929) as Miss Twill (uncredited)
 Wedding Wings (1929)  as Ester Quinn
 The Third Alarm (1930) as Mrs. Craig - Orphanage Matron
 Huckleberry Finn (1931) as Abigail Martin (uncredited)
 Range Law (1931) as Ruth's Attendant

References

External links 
 

 

1886 births
1946 deaths
20th-century American actresses
American film actresses
American silent film actresses